The AFC first round of 2002 FIFA World Cup qualification was contested between 40 AFC members.

The top country in each group at the end of the stage progressed to the second round, where the ten remaining teams were divided into two groups of five.

Group 1

Group 2

Group 3

Group 4

Group 5

Group 6

N.B. group originally scheduled to play 6 matches in Kathmandu, 25–29 March 2001. After Nepal withdrew from organising the matches, the AFC assigned the group to Almaty, Kazakhstan. Following a protest by Iraq, it was decided to first play 6 matches in either Amman or Baghdad (later fixed at Baghdad) and the remaining 6 in Almaty.

Group 7

Group 8

Group 9

Group 10

External links
 FIFA.com Reports
 RSSSF Page

1
Qual
Qual